Mes-e Sarcheshmeh (also known as Sar Cheshmeh and Shahrak-e Mes-e Sar Cheshmeh) is a city in the Central District of Rafsanjan County, Kerman Province, Iran.  At the 2006 census, its population was 8,451, in 2,182 families.

The word "mes" means copper in Persian. The city is so-named because it is the site of the second largest copper mine in the world.

References

Populated places in Rafsanjan County

Cities in Kerman Province